Escape from Mogadishu is a 2021 South Korean action drama film, directed by Ryoo Seung-wan and starring Kim Yoon-seok, Jo In-sung, Heo Joon-ho, Koo Kyo-hwan, Kim So-jin and Jung Man-sik. The film, based on real events, is set during the Somali Civil War and the two Koreas' efforts to be admitted to the United Nations in the late 1980s and early 1990s. It depicts details of a perilous escape attempt made by North and South Korean embassy workers stranded during the conflict.

With a production cost of 24 billion, Escape from Mogadishu was anticipated to release in summer of 2020 but its release was postponed due to the resurgence of the COVID-19 pandemic. It was released theatrically on July 28, 2021, by Lotte Entertainment in IMAX format. It received generally positive reviews from critics, who praised its action scenes, humorous plot, direction, and its vivid acting performances.

On accounting its box office performance, the film ranked at number 5 at the worldwide box office in the first week of August 2021 as per American media Screen Daily report on August 11. Within 56 days of release, it surpassed 3.5 million admissions, and became the first Korean film in 2021 to do so. , it is the highest-grossing Korean film of 2021, with gross of US$29 million and 3.61 million admissions. 

The film was selected as the South Korean entry for the Best International Feature Film at the 94th Academy Awards, but it was not nominated. It won six awards each at 30th Buil Film Awards and at 42nd Blue Dragon Film Awards including 'Best Film' award. At Blue Dragon Film Awards it was voted as Most Popular Film and Koo Kyo-hwan as Popular Star. , it has won  twenty-five awards overall at various award ceremonies.

Plot

In 1991, Mogadishu, the capital city of Somalia, is still ruled by the Barre government but threatened by a rebel movement. Meanwhile, both the North and South Korean embassies are lobbying to be admitted into the United Nations and looking towards the Somali government for support. 

Kang Dae-jin, an intelligence officer recently assigned to the South Korean embassy, is tasked with passing gifts from the South Korean government to President Barre. He meets Han Sin-seong, the ambassador in Somalia, who is running late to the meeting with the president and thus immediately takes the gifts. While en route to the presidential palace, rebels intercept the ambassador and rob the gifts. They further spray his car with bullets, forcing him and his secretary, Gong Su-cheol, to run to the presidential palace. The two men miss the appointment by fifteen minutes and are thus denied an audience with the president. As Sin-seong attempts to explain their delay, he catches a glimpse of the North Korean ambassador, Rim Yong-su, being escorted into a meeting room. In his view, Somalia's support for North Korea will prevent South Korea from joining the UN. Sin-seong initially believes Yong-su to be the mastermind behind the robbery, but it is revealed that the North Korean embassy's intelligence officer, Tae Joon-ki, was the one who bribed the rebels to delay and rob Sin-seong. Knowing what happened, Yong-su tells Joon-ki that this was a shameless act that was unhelpful and possibly detrimental to the North Korean efforts.

Dae-jin reveals to Sin-Seong that he had bribed a Western journalist with a packet of cigarettes for photos depicting rebels wielding North Korean-made firearms, thus implying that North Korea is supplying weapons to both the Somali government and the rebels. When Sin-seong questions this, Dae-jin dismisses his concerns, stating that if the photos are published, the Somali government will condemn North Korea even if the latter is not ultimately responsible for the weapons. The next day they meet with the Somali foreign minister at a hotel, showing him the photos. However the minister does not care and instead asks for bribes. Disgusted, Sin-seong leaves the meeting and spots North Korean Ambassador Rim moving gifts into the minister's car. Sin-seong confronts him about the robbery earlier; the latter counters that the South was no better for framing the North for supplying weapons to the rebels. Before the two come to blows, shots ring out outside the hotel - the civil war has reached Mogadishu.

Both North and South Korean diplomats are stranded in the hotel for hours as the Somali government imposes a lockdown on Mogadishu. Meanwhile at the South Korean embassy, Sin-seong's wife, Myeung-hee, and the other diplomats, are startled by the ringing doorbell; apparently the ambassador's Somali driver, Sawma, has stumbled into the embassy, badly wounded. Su-cheol carries him inside, but upon laying him on a bed he notices Sawma's scarf bearing the markings of General Aidid's rebels. While the diplomats contemplate on what to do with him in fear that he was actually a rebel, the police suddenly arrive and try to barge their way into the compound. Sin-seong and Dae-jin arrive just in time to ward them off. Meanwhile, Sawma had slipped out of the embassy, and while running on the streets, the police catch up to him and bludgeon him to death. 

The next day riots have broken out at every area of Mogadishu. General Aidid has also sent messages to all embassies to either work with them to topple the Barre regime, or be deemed an enemy and be prepared to be slaughtered. Sin-seong, fearing for Myeung-hee's safety, tries sending her back to South Korea, but is unable to do so as all banks and travel agencies have been shut, thus leaving everyone stranded in Mogadishu. As the Somali military finally retaliates with lethal force, both the North and South Korean diplomats realize that the situation has spiraled out of control and with both power and communication networks all being broken, they must leave the country as quickly as possible. Sin-seong and Dae-jin head to the airport but are sent back as they are unable to communicate to the home government in Seoul, and lack official documents of clearance. Likewise, the North Koreans fail to make it to the airport, and are sent back to their embassy.

In his desperation, Joon-ki sends for the rebel leader that he had previously employed to rob the South Koreans, for his assistance to get passes for the North Korean diplomats to get to the airport. However, the rebel leader betrays Joon-ki just as he set foot into the compound and the rebels started beating the men, robbing the entire place, and sexually harassing the women. Joon-ki, though beaten heavily, is spared as he once paid the rebels well for the job. 

With supplies nearly gone, Yong-su orders an evacuation and to head to the Chinese embassy for shelter, only to find it abandoned and being looted by rebels. They are discovered by a group of child soldiers, who point their rifles at them. The children in the North Korean posse pretend that they were shot and collapse on the ground; the adults follow suit. The child soldiers happily shoot in the air in victory, attracting the attention of more rebels. The North Koreans swiftly flee and stumble right outside the South Korean embassy. Seeing no other option, Yong-su decides to ask the South Koreans for help, despite Joon-ki protesting that doing so would risk being labeled as traitors in Pyongyang. He yells for sanctuary, within earshot of Sin-seong, who is suspicious of the North Koreans's motives. Just then, a group of rebels close towards the embassy, firing their guns wildly in the air, but are driven away by the security detail that Dae-jin had obtained from the police. With the North Koreans now in the line of danger, Sin-seong relents and opens the gate to let them in. 

As dinner is served, the North Koreans dare not touch the food in fear that the South Koreans had laced it with poison. Sin-seong swaps his rice bowl with Yong-su’s and eats from it, proving that the food wasn’t poisoned. Relieved, both sides start eating and sharing food. Dae-jin, sensing an opportunity to use the dinner as a ploy for propaganda, covertly takes pictures and steals the North Koreans’s diplomatic passports to make defection certificates, but Joon-ki catches him, and a fistfight breaks out between the two. Yong-su and Sin-seong step in and tear them both apart, lamenting that political ideologies no longer matter, but sheer survival and working together to escape Mogadishu. 

With both the Americans and Chinese already having fled Mogadishu, both ambassadors agree to seek help from their other allies that are still in the city; with Sin-seong heading to the Italian embassy while Yong-su heading to the Egyptian embassy. At the drack of dawn, Joon-ki and Yong-su reach the Egyptian embassy only to find it filled with refugees and no possible aid. Meanwhile at the Italian embassy, the Italian ambassador informs Sin-seong and Dae-jin that the South Koreans can join the Red Cross's evacuation flight to Mombasa, Kenya, but that the North Koreans cannot, as Italy and North Korea do not have diplomatic relations. Sin-seong lies that the North Koreans are defectors to the South but that they cannot prove this until their return. The Italian ambassador accept this and allows the entire party to board the plane, requiring all to arrive by 4pm.

With this assurance, the Koreans make preparations to leave, including taping the cars with bags of dirt and books as makeshift armor, and making white flags out of their clothes. The convoy depart during Islamic prayer time, allowing them to pass through the city unscathed while the rebels are in prayer. At a Somali army roadblock. Dae-jin, driving the lead car, attempts to negotiate with the commander for passage, but Su-cheol, driving the last car, sticks his white flag out of the window. The guards mistake the pole for a gun and start firing at the Koreans, forcing them to retreat. The convoy, already being pursued the Somali army, runs into a group of looting rebels, who chase after them as well. 

Eventually, the Koreans arrive right outside the Italian embassy. Realizing where they are, the Somali army ceases firing, and suddenly, the street turns into a tense Mexican standoff. Italian troops open the gates and secure the Koreans, while both the Somali army and the rebels retreat from the area. Joon-ki, whose car had separated from the convoy and was last to arrive, dies from the bullet wounds he had sustained; he is buried inside the Italian embassy. The next day, the Koreans board the plane as promised by the Italians and are flown to Mombasa.

As the plane lands, Sin-seong realizes that both parties have separate delegations waiting to intercept their respective groups. Despite working together for survival in Somalia, Yong-su and Sin-seong conclude that they cannot be seen together, as neither nation will believe their experiences but instead send them to their respective military tribunals for court martial. As passengers exit the plane, the diplomats bid each other farewell, before promptly splitting into their original groups to join their respective delegations. With one last look at each other, the ambassadors get on their respective buses and head in opposite directions.

Cast
 Kim Yoon-seok as Han Sin-seong, South Korean Ambassador to Somalia
 Jo In-sung as Kang Dae-jin, South Korea's ANSP intelligence officer and attached as Embassy Counselor
 Heo Joon-ho as Rim Yong-su, North Korean Ambassador to Somalia
 Koo Kyo-hwan as Tae Joon-ki, North Korea's MSS intelligence officer and attached as Embassy Counselor
 Kim So-jin as Kim Myung-hee, wife of Ambassador Han
 Jung Man-sik as Gong Su-cheol, secretary to Ambassador Han
 Kim Jae-hwa as Jo Soo-jin, staff officer of the South Korean Embassy
 Park Kyung-hye as Park Ji-eun, translator of the South Korean Embassy
 Enrico Ianniello as Ambassador Mario

Special appearance	 
 Yoon Kyung-ho as ANSP senior officer

Production
On June 10, 2019, Kim Yoon-seok and Jo In-sung positively considered appearing for director Ryoo Seung-wan's film Escape from Mogadishu. This was first appearance of the actors together as well as their first appearance in Ryoo Seung-wan film. Heo Joon-ho confirmed his appearance in June 2019.

The film was entirely shot in Morocco in the second half of 2019. The post production work started in May 2020.

Release
On July 22, 2021, CJ CGV announced that the film would be screened at all theaters including IMAX, ScreenX, 4DX, and 4DX screens starting on July 28, 2021. It is the second Korean film after the 2020 action-horror film Peninsula to simultaneously screen in all formats in the CGV special theaters.

Escape from Mogadishu was invited to be the opening film of the 20th New York Asian Film Festival. The two-week festival was held from August 6 to 22, 2021 in New York. The film was screened at Walter Reade Theater, Film at Lincoln Center on August 6, 2021, and at 10th Korean Film Festival Frankfurt on October 20, 2021 as opening film. The film was invited to the New Zealand International Film Festival in Wellington edition was screened on November 5, 2021. It was also screened as the opening film of 16th London Korean Film Festival on November 8, 2021.

The film is being screened in 42 theaters in North America as of August 11, 2021.

In April 2022, it was selected at the 24th edition of Far East Film Festival at Udine held from April 22 to 30.

It will be re-released in its second run on September 7, 2022 in theatres coinciding with Chuseok holidays.

Home media
The film was made available for streaming globally on Amazon Prime Video from February 2022. Soon after, it was released in India.

Reception

Box office
The film was released on July 28, 2021 on 1,688 screens. According to the integrated computer network for movie theater admissions by the Korea Film Council (KoFiC), the film ranked at first place at the Korean box office by recording 75,624 pre-order audiences as on July 28, 2021, surpassing the audiences of Jungle Cruise. The film set the record for the best opening of the year 2021 for all the Korean films released as of July 28, by getting 126,626 audience on the day of release. The film maintained its first place at the Korean box office on second day with addition of 89,826 viewers and taking cumulative audience to 226,569. The film by mobilizing 540,000 cumulative audience in 4 days of release became the first Korean film in 2021 to garner 500,000 audience in the shortest period of time. It is also maintaining its number one position at the Korean box office. 

The film garnered 1 million cumulative audiences in 7 days of release, thereby becoming highest grosser Korean film of 2021 surpassing the box office figures of film Hard Hit. It surpassed 2 million cumulative audience on 17th day of its release and 3 million on 33rd day of release. It took 56 days for the film to cross 3.5 million mark. It is the first Korean film to cross 3.5 million cumulative audience in 2021.

According to Korean Film Council (Kofic) data,  it is the second highest-grossing film among all the  films released in the year 2021 in South Korea, and highest-grossing Korean film with gross of US$29 million and 3.61 million admissions. And, as per Box Office Mojo it ranks 89 at 2021 Worldwide Box Office.

Critical response
 The website's critics consensus reads: "Its depiction of actual events is questionable, but Escape from Mogadishu is sleekly effective as an intelligent, well-acted action thriller."

Kim Ji-eun reviewing for Newsis wrote that the action scenes were spectacular and the humor, though small, stood out. She opined that the film vividly portrayed the horrors of war and the emotions of the characters who faced it. Kim felt that the exotic scenery of Morocco, the filming location, in itself was the main character in the film. Ending her review she wrote, "It's not light entertainment. While the heavy historical background and setting dominate the screen, attention is focused on what kind of variable the restrained emotion that utilizes reality, will affect the box office performance."

Kim Seong-hyeon writing for YTN felt that director Ryoo Seung-wan had reproduced the Somali civil war in 1990 as if it were in 2021, and portrayed the tense situation so well that the audience would experience it vividly. Mentioning the escape scene from the city center, Kim said that it was a highlight of the film. The reviewer felt that even in tense situations the humor was well placed. He pointed out that some conversations and actions of characters and of the Somali people seemed to contain intentional messages, but concluded the review with, "Nevertheless, Escape from Mogadishu offers intense cinematic pleasure enough to offset all of this."

Kim Ji-won of Ten Asia opened the review writing, "Audio-visual pleasure and humanism that transcends ideology are properly harmonized. .... the action scenes contain the desperate psychology of the characters, bringing both entertainment and depth." She opined that the escape scene was highlight of the film, as the sequence conveyed the hopelessness of the characters, the horrors of war and the smell of sweat. She praised the performance of ensemble and wrote, ".... the supporting actors played their roles in their respective places, completing a lively story."
Concluding her review, Kim wrote, "Most of the Korean films, which are about inter-Korean conflicts, use a squeezing code of tears, but Escape from Mogadishu gives a neat impression with dramatic and simple expressions without being overly emotional."

Cary Darling reviewing the film rated it 4 out of 5 stars and expressed the opinion that, "[..] an involving and suspenseful action-thriller that Ryoo Seung-wan handles with flair, capably staging big action scenes — like the final, nerve-rattling drive to potential salvation — while not neglecting the human stories at their heart."

Roger Moore reviewing the film rated it 3.5 out of 5 stars, and wrote that the sets of firefights were as good as Ridley Scott's Black Hawk Down, but the struggle to escape was more on a human level than a flamboyant one. He liked the climax scenes where convoy of cars were moving in a hail of Molotov cocktails and bullets, and concluded, "You want great action? Eschew the comic book movies and read a few subtitles. Escape from Mogadishu is in a league of its own this summer."

Richard Kuipers of Variety praising the screenplay and direction by Ryoo Seung-wan said, "propulsive and intelligently written South Korean adventure thriller" has been 'energetically' directed. He also praised the performance of its ensemble cast. Kuipers appreciating the climax of chasing bashed-up cars on the streets of Mogadishu concluded, "Even though the outcome is never in doubt, the execution of this survival run is genuinely thrilling."

Evan Dossey of Midwest Film Journal wrote that the characters of the film are aptly defined. He praised  Ryoo Seung-wan's script and said, "[he] makes sure the conflicts are expressed through compelling, well-developed characters." Dossey concluded, "Escape from Mogadishu is a tense political thriller so don’t go in expecting an action film. [....] instead, prepare yourself for a well-written story of conflicting politics that asks where nationality must end for humanity to persevere."

Panos Kotzathanasis reviewing for HanCinema highlighted three elements of the direction of Ryoo Seung-wan in the film. In his opinion the first was characterization, which has helped the actors to give laudable performances. The second was the action for which Kotzathanasis praised the cinematography of Choi Young-hwan, terming it "exceptional", and the editing of Lee Gang-hui. And the third was narrative, having humor, "[..] which appears in the most unexpected moments in order to lighten the mood". Kotzathanasis ends the review with, "Escape from Mogadishu is a great action movie that also works very well on a contextual level, due to the plethora of sociopolitcal elements included."

Anna Smith for Deadline, wrote that Escape from Mogadishu is an engrossing film, which reminded her of Ben Affleck’s escape thriller Argo and 2005 French war film Joyeux Noël by Christian Carion. Smith liked the setting of scenes, characters and humor in the film and said, "Propelled by a naturally cinematic true story, the thriller blends action with humor and heart to crowd-pleasing effect."

Lee Jutton of Film Inquiry, calling the humor in the film "a huge asset", concluded the review as "With stellar performances from everyone involved, especially Kim and Heo as the rival ambassadors turned temporary allies, it’s easy to become wholly engaged by a blockbuster like Escape from Mogadishu."

Carla Hay of Culture Mix, praised the performance of lead cast in the film writing, "All of the principal cast members give solid performances." She opined that the film had many heart throbbing, uncertain and unexpected situations taking film to climax. Carla concluded the review writing, "And it’s a memorable depiction of what people will or will not do to hold on to patriotic allegiances when there are life-or-death decisions to be made."

James Marsh reviewing for South China Morning Post rated the film with 3 out of 5 stars and said, "Ryoo, who specialises in testosterone-fuelled action cinema, makes good use of his dusty, arid locations to accentuate the characters' overwhelming sense of peril and vulnerability."

Awards and nominations

See also
 List of submissions to the 94th Academy Awards for Best International Feature Film
 List of South Korean submissions for the Academy Award for Best International Feature Film

References

External links
 
 
 
 
 

2020s Korean-language films
Films postponed due to the COVID-19 pandemic
2021 films
Lotte Entertainment films
South Korean action drama films
South Korean thriller drama films
South Korean action thriller films
Films about diplomats
Films about North Korea–South Korea relations
Films shot in Morocco
Films set in Mogadishu
Films set in Mombasa
Films set in Somalia
Films set in 1990
Films set in 1991
Somali Civil War films
Films directed by Ryoo Seung-wan
Action films based on actual events
Drama films based on actual events
Thriller films based on actual events
IMAX films
2021 action drama films
South Korean films based on actual events
4DX films
Somalia–South Korea relations